Matthew or Matt Watson may refer to:

 Matthew Watson (footballer, born 1976), Australian rules footballer with Essendon
 Matthew Watson (footballer, born 1992), Australian rules footballer with Carlton
 Matthew Watson (political economist), professor of political economy
 Matt Watson (baseball) (born 1978), American baseball player
 Matt Watson (cricketer) (born 1987), English cricketer
 Matt Watson (entrepreneur) (born 1981), American entrepreneur
 Matt Watson (footballer, born 1936) (1936–2015), Scottish football player
 Matt Watson (footballer, born 1985), US-based soccer player
 Matt Watson (YouTuber) (born 1996), American YouTuber, comedian, and musician
 Matt Watson, fisherman and host of The ITM Fishing Show
 Mat Watson, British presenter on the UK-based platform carwow